Triguna Sen (24 December 1905 – 11 January 1998) was Union Minister for education in Government of India. He got Padma Bhushan in 1965. He was first Vice-Chancellor of Jadavpur University (from 1956 to 1966) and 11th Vice-Chancellor of Banaras Hindu University. He was a member of the Rajya Sabha from 1967 to 1974. He was a member of Governing Body as a Professor for Vijaygarh Jyotish Ray College ( Jadavpur).

References

20th-century Indian educational theorists
20th-century Bengalis
Bengali educators
Bengali Hindus
West Bengal politicians
Recipients of the Padma Bhushan in literature & education
1905 births
1998 deaths
Academic staff of Jadavpur University
Rajya Sabha members from Tripura
Education Ministers of India
Scientists from Tripura
Educators from West Bengal
20th-century Indian educators
Educationists from India